Hornsea Cottage Hospital is a health facility in Eastgate, Hornsea, East Riding of Yorkshire, England.

History
The facility, which was built as a lasting memorial to soldiers who died in the First World War, opened in 1923. Originally providing just eight beds, it joined the National Health Service in 1948 and benefited from a major refurbishment in 2012. The minor injuries unit closed in April 2018.

References

Hospitals established in 1923
1923 establishments in England
Hospital buildings completed in 1923
Hospitals in the East Riding of Yorkshire
NHS hospitals in England
Hornsea